The 2012–13 Färjestad BK season was Färjestad BK's 38th season in the Elitserien ice hockey league (SEL), the top division in Sweden. They finished second in the regular season and lost to Luleå HF in the playoff semifinals, four games to one.

Regular season

Standings

Playoffs

Quarterfinals

(2) Färjestad BK vs. (7) Modo Hockey

Semifinals

(2) Färjestad BK vs. (3) Luleå HF
Luleå won the series 4–1 and advanced to the Finals for the first time since winning the Swedish Championship in 1996.
Linus Persson's game-deciding goal in Game 4, 12 seconds into overtime, is a new record for the fastest overtime goal scored in Elitserien playoff history.

References 

2012–13 Elitserien season
2012-13